Lewis Ross may refer to:

Lewis W. Ross, U.S. politician
Lewis Ross (Canadian politician)

See also
Louis Ross, American architect
Louis S. Ross, inventor of the Ross (steam automobile)